Shurab-e Lor (also Romanized as Shūrāb-e Lor and Shūr Āb-e Lor; also known as Shūr Āb and Shūrāb-e Bālā) is a village in Bakesh-e Do Rural District, in the Central District of Mamasani County, Fars Province, Iran. At the 2006 census, its population was 21, in 5 families.

References 

Populated places in Mamasani County